is the fourth Jewelpet anime series created by Sanrio and Sega and animated by Studio Comet, announced in Shogakukan's Pucchigumi magazine and directed by Makoto Moriwaki. The series first aired on April 7, 2012, on TV Tokyo and TV Osaka and ended its broadcast on March 30, 2013. The whole series is a complete departure to the previous three series, including the human character's art design is reverted to the first series. The series focuses on Pink Oomiya, a member of a Super Sentai-like team called "Kira Deco 5".

Universal Music handles the DVD release of the series in Japan, with the first volume been released on August 22, 2012. Six Volumes were released so far. Victor Entertainment also released a Blu-ray Selection Box Set on September 20, 2013, which contained 16 selected episodes of the series and a special limited edition Pink Oomiya Apron of Magic card.

Episode list

References

External links
http://www.tv-tokyo.co.jp/anime/jp-kiradeco/

Kira Deco!